The 33rd Assembly District of Wisconsin is one of 99 districts in the Wisconsin State Assembly. Located in southeast Wisconsin, the district comprises the southern half of Jefferson County and parts of northeast Rock County.  It includes the cities of Fort Atkinson, Jefferson, and Milton, and part of the city of Janesville, as well as the villages of Palmyra and Sullivan.  The district is represented by Republican Scott Johnson, since January 2023.

The 33rd Assembly district is located within Wisconsin's 11th Senate district, along with the 31st and 32nd Assembly districts.

List of past representatives

Electoral history

References 

Wisconsin State Assembly districts
Jefferson County, Wisconsin
Waukesha County, Wisconsin
Walworth County, Wisconsin